Matthew Gardiner may refer to:
 Matthew Gardiner (trade unionist)
 Matthew Gardiner (minister)
 Matthew Gardiner (footballer)
 Matthew Gardiner (artist)
 Matthew Gardiner, Irish dancer of the Gardiner Brothers